The Flag of Novosibirsk Oblast is the official symbol of Novosibirsk Oblast, Russia.

Description
The flag of the Novosibirsk Region is a rectangular panel which shows five different-sized stripes of red, white, blue, white, and green (left-to-right).

Between the red and green stripes, two black sable are depicted holding a yellow loaf of korovai with a salt shaker. Underneath, the white and blue stripes are crossed by a horizontal narrow belt which is colored black on the white and white on the blue.

The ratio of the width of the stripes to the length of the flag is 5: 3: 2: 3: 5, respectively. The ratio of the width of the flag to the length is 2: 3. The ratio of the width of the belt to the width of the flag is 1:80.

On the initial sketch drawn by the Novosibirsk artist Grigory Kuzhelev, a blue stripe was used in place of the red stripe. Blue was to symbolize the Ob River; white, purity of thoughts; and green, natural wealth. The red bar was added at the insistence of the Communist Party faction of the Regional Council.

Symbolism
The color and symbolic meaning of the flag are reflective of the Siberian region and the historical heraldry of Novosibirsk, of which white, green, red and blue are the main colors.

White symbolizes purity, devotion, and faith, as well as the color of the harsh Siberian winter.

Green symbolizes hope, abundance, rebirth, and vitality, personifying the natural diversity and beauty of the fertile land of Novosibirsk.

Red symbolizes courage and the memory of the heroism of the Novosibirsk people in defending their homeland.

Blue symbolizes the Ob River and the numerous lakes and rivers occupying almost a third of the region.

In the center of the flag is the emblem of the region, two black sables depicted holding a yellow loaf of korovai with a salt shaker.

References

Novosibirsk Oblast
Novosibirsk
Novosibirsk Oblast
Novosibirsk